Jefferson Township is one of six townships in Tipton County, Indiana, United States. As of the 2010 census, its population was 1,422 and it contained 616 housing units.

History

Squatters were the first white settlers in the area. Barnett Stepp was the first known white settler in Jefferson Township. He moved with his family, from Kentucky, to the southern part of the future township in 1835. Stepp maintained a small home and farm until his death in 1852. A son-in-law of Stepp, named Horton, came to the township in 1836, settling on 160 acres just east of Stepp's land. Over the course of the decade, more families settled in the area. The first blacksmith shop was founded in the area in the late 1830s by Robert Smith, near Tetersburg. Miami Indians still resided in the area as of 1840. The area was very rural and early settlers struggled to acquire clothing and groceries. Farmers traded crops and animal skins for items they needed. People had to travel from Jefferson Township to Cicero, Indiana, which was 16 miles away and treacherous given the poor quality of roads. Wheat began to be grown in the area and was a popular commodity to trade in Cicero.

In 1837, the first orchard was planted in the township. The following year, the first log cabin was built in the area, followed by the first frame house ten years later, in 1848.
The first brick building was built in 1868. In 1845, the first mill was built near Normanda. Additional mills were built in the area and a tannery was built in 1849, only to close in 1856. The first cemetery was founded in Tetersburg in 1847.

The first township elections were held in 1844. A Protestant Methodist congregation was founded in the township in 1863. A church was built in 1873 just north of Kempton.

As of the early 20th century, farming was the main industry, specifically fruit. The Lake Erie & Western railroad ran east to west through the township providing economic support, transportation and communication.

Geography

Natural environments

Historically, Jefferson Township was fairly flat with a lot of low, marshy ground. The west side of the township was prairie with some small amounts of trees and shrubs, including willow and scrub oak. In the southern part, the soil was light in color and sandy in lower areas. In some areas the soil is thick and black and good for agricultural purposes.

Cities, towns, villages
 Kempton

Unincorporated towns
 East Union at 
 Ekin at 
 Goldsmith at 
 Normanda at 
 Tetersburg at 
(This list is based on USGS data and may include former settlements.)

Former settlements
 Jericho

Adjacent townships
 Prairie Township (north)
 Cicero Township (east)
 Jackson Township, Hamilton County (southeast)
 Adams Township, Hamilton County (south)
 Johnson Township, Clinton County (west)
 Sugar Creek Township, Clinton County (west)

Government

Political districts
 Indiana's 5th congressional district
 State House District 32
 State Senate District 21

Early history
The first school in the township began in 1842, just south of Goldsmith. The first teacher, James Forsythe, was described as being a "good instructor," and having a criminal past. He was arrested in Hamilton County for larceny at one point during his life. After he left, his son, Peter, taught at the school. Two additional schools were built in the township around this time. The first was near Jericho and the second near Normanda. Eventually, another school was built in Tetersburg.

Today

Students in Jefferson Township attend schools in the Tipton Community School Corporation.

Infrastructure

Major highways
  U.S. Route 31
  State Road 28

Cemeteries
The township contains these four cemeteries: Kempton, Small, Tucker and Wolford.

References

Footnotes

Sources
 Pershing, Marvin W. "History of Tipton County, Indiana: Her People, Industries and Institutions". Indianapolis: B.F. Bowen (1914).

External links
 Indiana Township Association
 United Township Association of Indiana

Townships in Tipton County, Indiana
Kokomo, Indiana metropolitan area
Townships in Indiana